The University of La Verne (ULV) is a private university in La Verne, California. Founded in 1891, the university is composed of the College of Arts & Sciences, College of Business & Public Management, the LaFetra College of Education, College of Law, College of Health and Community Well-Being, an online adult school, two military centers, and a Regional Campus Administration that oversees six regional campuses. It awards undergraduate, graduate, and doctoral degrees. Many of their classes are taught at smaller campuses throughout the greater Los Angeles area and Kern County.

History

Lordsburg College 
The University of La Verne was founded in 1891 as Lordsburg College by members of the Church of the Brethren, a German Christian sect originating from the Schwarzenau Brethren.  Historically, the Brethren are considered one of the "peace churches", like the Quakers and the Mennonites, and slots on the Board of Trustees are still held for members of the Brethren. The baccalaureate ceremony is held at the local Church of the Brethren, and the holder of the post of campus minister must be a member of the Church of the Brethren.

The Lordsburg College originally opened in a hotel building located on the corner of 3rd Street and D Street in La Verne, CA (then called Lordsburg). The land-boom hotel is said to never have hosted a single paying guest, as the interest in land around Southern California had subsided by the time the hotel was complete. In 1899, two members of the Church of the Brethren decided the hotel building could be repurposed as a college, so they purchased the hotel, along with 100 city lots, for $15,000. The Lordsburg College building was demolished in 1928, shortly after the completion of Founders Hall.

In 1901, the Los Angeles Times wrote that the Lordsburg College "seems to be predestined to an early demise." Attendance had shrunk to only 12 students, just two more than the number of faculty, and the college had been burdened by multiple scandals involving its administration. The college's second president, E.A. Miller, had a scandal in Virginia which followed him to California. William Hoover, the school's fourth president, resigned in 1901.

La Verne College 
When the agricultural town of Lordsburg renamed itself to La Verne in 1917, Lordsburg College renamed itself accordingly, becoming La Verne College. The college reorganized in 1977, 87 years after its founding, to become the University of La Verne. Since then, the University has grown to consist of the College of Arts and Sciences, the College of Business and Public Management, the LaFetra College of Education, the College of Law, and multiple regional campuses.

The University of La Verne conferred its first master's degree in 1965 and awarded its first doctorate in 1969. In 1969, La Verne began its adult education program. The University opened its first regional campus, in Orange County, in 1981 and has since opened additional locations throughout the area, including Vandenberg AFB and Pt. Mugu. Despite its Church of the Brethren heritage, the University describes itself as non-sectarian.

Athens, Greece
La Verne extended to a campus in Athens in 1975, mainly for the children of US military personnel. Students and faculty were given 48 hours' notice of the closure prior to the start of classes. Stephen C. Morgan, president of La Verne at the time, justified the closure on financial grounds. The Athens campus had by 2004 gained a reputation as "one of the best private, English-language institutions in Greece".

Enrollment and admissions 

The University of La Verne does not require the SAT or ACT for first-time freshmen students applying for admission. For those providing scores in 2021, the average SAT was score was between 960-1150 and an average ACT score was between 17-23.

According to U.S. News & World Report, the acceptance rate for the University of La Verne was 73% for 2022.

Academics
La Verne Online offers select programs through online coursework and some programs offer student choice on whether to take a class on campus or online.

Colleges 
The University of La Verne has five colleges:

 The College of Arts and Sciences
 The LaFetra College of Education
 The College of Business and Public Management
 The College of Law
 The College of Health and Community Well-Being

College of Law

The University of La Verne College of Law was founded in 1970 and is currently located in Ontario, California. In February 2006, the College of Law was provisionally accredited by the American Bar Association (ABA), allowing students to take the bar exam and become practicing attorneys in any U.S. jurisdiction.  In June 2011, the ABA denied the College full ABA accreditation.  On August 29, 2011, the College announced it received accreditation from the Committee of Bar Examiners of the State Bar of California.  In March 2012, the ABA again granted provisional approval.  On March 14, 2016, the ABA granted full accreditation.  Of the La Verne graduates who took the California bar exam for the first time in July 2016, 31% passed, vs. a statewide average of 62%. In November 2019, the College of law's board of trustees voted to change from an ABA accredited school to a California Bar accredited school, which decision was influenced in part by the ABA’s introduction of tougher accreditation standards in May 2019, which shortened the timeframe schools had to ensure a 75-percent bar pass rate from five to two years.

Online school 
The University of La Verne offers a limited number of undergraduate and graduate degree programs fully online.

Accreditations 
The University of La Verne is accredited by the Accrediting Commission for Senior Colleges and Universities of the Western Association of Schools and Colleges (WASC).  Several programs are accredited or approved by discipline-specific organizations:
 The Physician Assistant program is provisionally accredited by the Accreditation Review Commission on Education for the Physician Assistant.
 The Doctorate in Clinical Psychology is accredited by the American Psychological Association.
 The Master of Public Administration program is accredited by the National Association of Schools of Public Affairs and Administration (NASPAA).
 Teacher education programs are approved by the California Commission on Teacher Credentialing (CCTC).
The College of Law is accredited by the State Bar of California

Rankings 
The University of La Verne is ranked #6 nationally for social mobility, #101 nationally for best value, #151 among all national universities, and having a $48,200 median starting salary of alumni
as reported in U.S. News & World Report's 2022-2023 Best Colleges rankings.

The University of La Verne is ranked sixth among programs in the Greater Los Angeles area and #111 nationally in the U.S. News & World Report 2022 Best Graduate Schools ranking for Public Affairs.

The University of La Verne is ranked in four categories in the U.S. News & World Report rankings for Best Online Programs. Those are Online Bachelor's Programs, Best Online Bachelor's Programs for Veterans, Best Online Bachelor's in Business Programs, and Best Online MBA Programs.

A study published in the peer-reviewed Journal of Consumer Affairs ranked the university at No. 1 in California and No. 11 nationally for alumni satisfaction.

Campus 

The University of La Verne's address is 1950 3rd Street in La Verne, California. Some of the most prominent buildings on campus include Founders Hall, which was completed in 1927, the Abraham Campus Center, the Sports Science & Athletics Pavilion, Citrus Hall, and the Wilson Library.

In 2014, La Verne held a grand opening ceremony for the newly constructed Campus West, located just over a half-mile from the main campus. Campus West is home to the university's baseball and softball fields.

Some of the oldest buildings still standing on campus include Founders Hall, Miller Hall (constructed in 1918), and the Hanawalt House (constructed in 1905).

Student housing 

There are three on-campus housing options for students.

 Citrus Hall
 Vista La Verne
 The Oaks

Citrus Hall opened for the Fall 2018 semester and houses about 400 students. The Spot dining hall, located on the first floor of Citrus Hall in wings B and C, opened at the same time, replacing the Davenport Dining Hall a block away. Generally, Citrus Hall houses first-year students, Vista La Verne houses graduate students, and continuing students stay in either Vista La Verne or The Oaks.

Sports Science and Athletics Pavilion 
The Sports Science and Athletics Pavilion, or SSAP, is a large tent structure located in the central campus, between the football stadium and Citrus Hall. The SSAP has an indoor basketball/volleyball court, workout rooms, locker rooms, classrooms, and various other facilities. When first constructed in the 1970s, the building contained facilities for the Athletics Department, Art Department, and the schools radio and TV stations. The SSAP also contained a snack bar and game area for students. The building now serves only the athletics department for the most part, as the Art and Communications departments now have their own building on D Street. The Campus Center now serves the functions the snack bar and game area once did.

A smaller tent located next to the SSAP contains the Dailey Theatre and other facilities for the Theatre Department.

Often referred to as "The Tents," or the "Super Tents," they were the "world’s first permanent–tensioned membrane structure" when completed in the early 1970s. They are constructed using a fabric made from woven fiberglass coated with Teflon.

Wilson Library 
The Elvin and Betty Wilson Library—La Verne's main library—contains over 193,000 volumes and access to over 70 academic databases.

An Alpha Beta supermarket was constructed on the corner of 'D' street and second street in 1955. The site was previously occupied by a park, which was constructed after the demolition of the original Lordsburg College building. In 1977, the University purchased the Alpha Beta supermarket and converted it into a new library. This was done with the help of contributions made by Elvin and Betty Wilson, the donors the library is now named after. The library was closed between 1993 and 1996 to allow for expansion, again with the help of the same donors.

The library is a two-story building, but has two level for books per floor, making it seem like a four-story building. The first floor has study and meeting rooms, a help desk, offices, and paid printing facilities. The second floor (third level) contains the Honors Center and one classroom. The university's archives and special collections are located on the fourth level.

Transportation 
A free shuttle used to be offered between the main campus at the Wilson Library and a remote parking lot, near Campus West. The shuttle service was suspended in 2019, after the opening of a new $16 million parking garage on the main campus in 2016, which added 693 spaces.

An extension to the LA Metro 'L' line is projected to be completed in 2025. A station will be located between the La Verne campus and the Pomona Fairplex, on the northeast corner of 'E' Street and Arrow Highway.

Student life and traditions

Greek life 
The University of La Verne has chapters of five sororities and two fraternities.

Fraternities 

 Phi Delta Theta (ΦΔΘ)
 Sigma Alpha Epsilon (ΣΑΕ)

Sororities 

 Alpha Omicron Pi ( ΑΟΠ)
 Iota Delta (ΙΔ)
 Phi Sigma Sigma (ΦΣΣ )
 Sigma Gamma Rho (ΣΓΡ)
 Sigma Kappa ( ΣΚ)

The Rock 
The rock has been a tradition at the University of La Verne for more than 60 years. The original rock was painted orange with the letters "LVC," because the school was still named La Verne College at the time. In the 1960s La Verne students took it upon themselves to replace the rock with a much larger one. They buried much of it so that it would not be stolen by rival schools, as the original rock had been in the past.

The new rock would be painted by clubs and organizations, sometimes being repainted overnight to prank other students. This tradition continues, but students must reserve the rock before painting it.

Homecoming 
Each year, La Verne holds its homecoming event prior to the homecoming football game. A street fair is held on 3rd Street, outside Founders Hall, and student clubs and organizations set up booths and host activities. A parade is also hosted with student made floats.

Student government 
The Associated Students of the University of La Verne (ASULV) is the University of La Verne's official student government. Aside from the executive board, there are two senators for the College of Arts and Sciences, two senators for the College of Business and Public Management, one senator for the College of Education, and five senators at large. All members are elected annually.

The Campus Activities Board (CAB) was founded in 2005 and is a non-profit on campus organization that organizes and coordinates events and programs on campus each year. CAB has two executive board members and nine chair persons.

Campus locations

United States
 Main Campus in La Verne
 University of La Verne College of Law in Ontario
 La Verne High Desert in Victorville
 La Verne Inland Empire in Ontario
 La Verne Kern County in Bakersfield
 La Verne Orange County in Irvine
 La Verne San Fernando Valley in Burbank
 La Verne Ventura County in Oxnard

Military satellite campuses:
 Point Mugu NAS
 Vandenberg SFB

Athletics
At the University of La Verne, approximately 30% of traditional-age undergraduates participate in intercollegiate athletics annually. (An NCAA Division III member, the University does not offer scholarships based on athletic ability.) Its athletic program is dedicated to developing scholar-athletes who demonstrate a commitment to academic and athletic success. Intercollegiate athletics are an integral part of the overall college experience, engaging the campus community and establishing a sense of spirit and pride while promoting a healthy lifestyle and fitness of mind and body.

La Verne has captured numerous SCIAC Championships, and has claimed NCAA team titles in baseball (1995), men's volleyball (1999) and women's volleyball (1982, 2001).
 Women's volleyball is a perennial national contender with three national titles (1981, 1982, 2001) and 22 conference championships in its history. The program produced two National Players of the Year (Amy Smith – 2003; Ryan Winn – 2001).
 Baseball has a national reputation stretching back five decades, with two national titles (1972, 1995) and 20 conference titles.
 Football's competitive tradition (including an undefeated conference season in 2015) can be traced back 83 years and is a keystone of the University's athletic legacy. 
 Softball has established a competitive reputation, earning eight NCAA Division III playoff berths since 2006. Arleena DeLaCruz (Pitcher) leading the way to the playoffs in 2006 and drafted professionally to the Chicago Bandits. 
 Men's golf won seven consecutive SCIAC championships from 2007 to 2013 and placed second at the Division III national championship tournaments twice (2007, 2009). Kelby Scharmann claimed the individual national championship in 2015 and Mitchell Fedorka received the Jack Nicklaus Award as the Golf Coaches Association of America's collegiate player of the year.
 Track and field programs are a national powerhouse, having produced nine individual national champions and 76 All-Americans.

La Verne offers 18 intercollegiate athletic teams—9 sports for men and 9 for women. The Leopards are a member of the Southern California Intercollegiate Athletic Conference (SCIAC) and compete at the NCAA Division III level.

Women's sports teams 
 Basketball
 Cross Country
 Golf
 Soccer
 Softball
 Swimming and Diving
 Track and Field
 Volleyball
 Water Polo

Men's sports teams 
 Baseball
 Basketball
 Cross Country
 Football
 Golf
 Soccer
 Swimming and Diving
 Track and Field
 Water Polo

Publications
 VOICE Magazine
 La Verne Magazine  
 Campus Times

Notable alumni
 Art Acevedo – Miami Police Department Chief of Police
 Joseph Ashton – American film and voice actor
 Vernard Eller – Author and Christian pacifist
 Phil Esbenshade – Professional skateboarder and attorney
 Roger Hernández – Democratic member of the California State Assembly
 David Hollinger – Preston Hotchkis Professor of History, emeritus at the University of California, Berkeley, author, former President of the Organization of American Historians
 Darren Kavinoky – Motivational Speaker
 Larry Kennan – Executive director of NFL Coaches Association (NFLCA)
 Ross Mathews – television host
 Mike Morrell – Republican member of the California State Assembly
 Steve Ortmayer – Assistant head coach of University of Kentucky football team
 Dan Quisenberry – Professional baseball player
 Alex Villanueva - Law enforcement officer serving as the 33rd Sheriff of Los Angeles County, California
 Joaquin Zendejas – Former football player
 Anthony Zuiker – CSI creator and executive producer

References

External links

Official website
Official athletics website

 
La Verne, California
Universities and colleges affiliated with the Church of the Brethren
Universities and colleges in the San Fernando Valley
Educational institutions established in 1891
Schools accredited by the Western Association of Schools and Colleges
San Gabriel Valley
1891 establishments in California
Private universities and colleges in California
Protestant universities and colleges in North America